tRNA(His) guanylyltransferase (histidine tRNA guanylyltransferase, Thg1p, Thg1) is an enzyme with systematic name p-tRNA(His):GTP guanylyltransferase (ATP-hydrolysing). This enzyme catalyses the following chemical reaction

 p-tRNA(His) + ATP + GTP  pppGp-tRNA(His) + AMP + diphosphate (overall reaction)
 (1a) p-tRNA(His) + ATP  App-tRNA(His) + diphosphate
 (1b) App-tRNA(His) + GTP  pppGp-tRNA(His) + AMP

The enzyme requires a divalent cation for activity.

References

External links 
 

EC 2.7.7